Kuik-e Mahmud (also Romanized as Kū’īk-e Maḩmūd; also known as Kūyakī-ye Maḩmūd) is a village in Dasht-e Zahab Rural District, in the Central District of Sarpol-e Zahab County, Kermanshah Province, Iran. Its population was 202, in 36 families (as of 2006 census).

.

References 

Populated places in Sarpol-e Zahab County